Christopher Tung Shieh, known professionally as Chris Grace, is an American actor and screenwriter. He is best known for playing Jerry in the NBC sitcom Superstore, and Christian Grey in the off-Broadway musical parody "50 Shades! The Musical".

Early life
Grace grew up in Houston, Texas. He began performing in junior high school.

Career
Grace is a member of Baby Wants Candy (BWC), a Chicago-based comedy ensemble. The group has performed in the US and abroad, including in New York, Singapore, and Scotland. BWC performed the musical parody 50 Shades! The Musical Parody and Thrones! The Musical Parody, both of which he co-wrote.

Grace's co-writer for 50 Shades! The Musical was Emily Dorezas.

Grace is also a regular performer in Magic to Do: Musical Improv held at UCB Sunset.

Filmography

References

External links
Official website

American male musical theatre actors
American male television actors
American male film actors
American male dramatists and playwrights
Year of birth missing (living people)
Living people
21st-century American male actors